Skarpnäck Airfield was an airfield on Skarpnäcksfältet, a subdistrict of Skarpnäck borough, Stockholm, Sweden. It was mostly used for gliding, and was closed in 1980. Apartment buildings were built at the site in the following years.

The airport was used as an auto racing circuit for the 1948 Stockholm Grand Prix, a Formula Two race, and the following year the Swedish Summer Grand Prix was held here. Automobile Racing were arranged the following years as well.

Lap Records

The official race lap records at Skarpnäck Airfield are listed as:

See also 
Skarpnäcksfältet

Sources

Metropolitan Stockholm
Buildings and structures in Stockholm
Defunct airports in Sweden
Airports in the Stockholm region
1980 disestablishments in Sweden

sv:Skarpnäcks flygfält